"The Schuyler Sisters" is the fifth song from Act 1 of the musical Hamilton, based on the life of Alexander Hamilton, which premiered on Broadway in 2015. Lin-Manuel Miranda wrote both the music and lyrics to the song.

Background
Musical director Alex Lacamoire explained that the song originally had a throwback Daft Punk/Pharrell feel, but after viewing a series of Vines with the three actresses improvising on Destiny's Child songs, he reworked the song to give it a Destiny's Child vibe, then let the sisters add their own harmonies to the tune; he "realized there's nothing in the song as cool as the harmonies the girls do when they're messing around, so we... just let them riff".

Synopsis
The song introduces the three Schuyler sisters: Angelica, Eliza, and Peggy, their different personalities and views, and how they are excited to be in a new age, "amidst the powder keg of the early days of the revolution". Burr tries to flirt with Angelica, but Angelica rejects him and instead professes how she wants a "revelation" instead of a "revolution."

Style
The New Yorker described the sisters as a "Destiny's Child-esque R&B girl group." Pitchfork said the song wouldn't sound out of place in an album by Wyclef protégé City High. The Guardian said the number "combines TLC with the Andrews Sisters and a hat tip to 'Three Little Maids From School Are We'". WIUX described it as "a pre-pre-feminist power anthem".

Critical reception
Entertainment Monthly says this song marks the moment when "the album really kicks it into high gear." Jeff Lunden of Byline said that this is the song he keeps "more or less in constant rotation". When Miranda appeared on the West Wing Weekly podcast, he said the line "I'm looking for a mind at work" was taken from the TV series The West Wing.

References

2015 songs
Songs from Hamilton (musical)
Songs with feminist themes
Songs about socialites